The Santo Domingo Affair, or the Santo Domingo Crisis, refers to an incident in 1904 involving the United States and Dominican militia forces in the Dominican Republic. After the death of a seaman from the USS Yankee on February 1, the U.S. military launched a punitive expedition which routed the Dominican forces.

Background
During the Banana Wars era, revolution in Central America was widespread. In order to protect American citizens and their interests in these war zones, the United States Navy patrolled the hostile coasts. Rebels in the city of Santo Domingo had previously fired on two American merchant ships and damaged property at the American-owned sugar cane plantations. USS Detroit had also landed sailors and marines beginning in November 1903, but they were withdrawn when the situation appeared stable. On February 1, 1904, the auxiliary cruiser USS Yankee  was on patrol off Santo Domingo, observing the fighting between government and rebel troops loyal to Carlos F. Morales and General Juan Isidro Jiminez. The American captain decided to put some men in a launch and send them ashore to make contact with the Dominicans, but when it drew away from Yankee the insurgents attacked it with small arms fire and Seaman J. C. Johnston was mortally wounded. In response, President Theodore Roosevelt ordered the protected cruisers [[USS Columbia (C-12)|USS Columbia]] and USS Newark to proceed to the islands and exact an apology. The temporary commander of the Brazil Squadron, Captain Richard Wainwright, was placed in charge of the operation on board  the Newark.

Incident
Wainwright arrived at Santo Domingo on the 10 February, finding that the USS Columbia had arrived on 8 February. The Columbia was under the command of Captain James M. Miller who was senior to Wainwright. Miller was anchored near the SS New York, one of the merchant ships attacked in November 1903 by the Dominican cruiser Presidente. On February 11, the launch from the Columbia, flying the American flag, was sent in toward the docks escorting the New York whose crew intended to offload their cargo. As they did so, the insurgents violated a pre-established armistice by opening fire with their small arms. Several shots hit the steamer and a few grazed the navy launch but there were no casualties. The two American vessels withdrew. Wainwright, having informed his superiors and gotten their approval, launched an amphibious assault and naval bombardment after first warning the American consul and civilians living in the city. Newark opened fire with her broadside at 3:25 pm, while the Columbia covered the landing. Ten minutes later the bombardment ceased and a force of 375 Americans headed to the beach. The landing party was under the direct command of Lieutenant Commander James P. Parker, the executive officer on the Columbia; the marines were led by Captain Albert S. Mclemore.

At least 100 armed rebels were using the old Fort Ozama as a base. The Americans received some enemy rifle fire while still on the water and when they landed at 4:30 pm, they attacked and routed the rebels. When the men on board Columbia observed the gunfire, Captain Wainwright ordered his gunners to open fire until 4:47, though the Newark'' continued the attack until 5:00. With the battle over, the Americans returned to their ships between 9:00 and 10:00 pm. Morales, Jiminez, and Wainwright signed another armistice and later a peace treaty which ended the hostilities. Only one American was hurt in the engagement when he accidentally fired his revolver into his foot; Dominican casualties are not known. The United States Marine Corps maintains a small cemetery in Santo Domingo. Seaman Johnston was the first to be buried there, followed by other men killed on the island during the Banana Wars.

See also
Mary Carver Affair
Rio de Janeiro Affair
First Sumatran Expedition
Second Sumatran Expedition
First Fiji Expedition
Second Fiji Expedition
Formosa Expedition
Nukapu Expedition

References

Sources

Banana Wars
Battles involving the Dominican Republic
Santo Domingo
Santo Domingo
Santo Domingo
Santo Domingo
Military history of the Dominican Republic
February 1904 events
Amphibious operations involving the United States